is a Japanese whisky distillery. Founded in 2016, the distillery is owned by Kenten Jitsugyo, a trading company based in Tokyo.

References

Notes

Bibliography

External links

  – official site (in English)

Distilleries in Japan
Japanese whisky
Companies based in Hokkaido
2016 establishments in Japan
Japanese brands